Poecilotheria fasciata,  or the Sri Lanka ornamental, is a large arboreal tarantula. It is endemic to central Sri Lanka.

Size
Females are 6–7 cm from head-to-body, whereas males are smaller usually 4–5 cm.

Identification
Poecilotheria fasciata can be identified from other tiger spiders due to very narrow dark band on the femur of first pair of legs and by thin broken band on femur of fourth pair of legs.

Female

Dorsally black, white and grey cryptic markings all over the legs and body. Carapace has two black lines. Opisthosoma has a light grey foliate median band runs the entire length of opisthosoma. Inside large foliate markings, there is a slightly darker median band.

Ventrally body is black. First and second leg pairs possess identical markings, which have yellow color bands. Third leg pair has bluish grey femur with a proximal black patch. Patella is blue grey with a thin black band distally. Fourth leg pair has bluish grey femur with a thin black band.

Male

Dorsally uniform brown colored with less intense markings. Opisthosoma has a dark median black line divided by distinct diamond-shaped chevrons.

All four pairs of legs are identically marked as female but with slight variations.

Ecology
Found in dry zone and intermediate zones of Sri Lanka. Mostly abundant in tree hollows, tree barks, coconut trees, banana plantations and sometimes in human dwellings. Male is nomadic, whereas female is not. When disturbed, they are very defensive and nimble.

References

External links
bighairyspiders.com, Fringed ornamental (Poecilotheria ornata)
Arachnids.info
Spider diaries
Itis.org

fasciata
Spiders of Asia
Endemic fauna of Sri Lanka
Spiders described in 1840